TextPad is a text editor for Microsoft Windows developed by Helios Software Solutions. It is currently in its eighth major version. TextPad was initially released in 1992 as shareware, with users requested to pay a registration fee to support future development. As of 1996 the company was an associate member of the Association of Shareware Professionals. By 1998 the company was pointing out that the editor was "shareware (try before you buy)" and payment was necessary to continue to use it.

Features 
Key features include:
 The ability to maintain block indents
 Automatic code indentation (see indent style)
 Regular expression based search and replace, including multiline regex
 Macro recording feature to facilitate complex text transformations and data processing.
 Macro feature supports multiple regex searches (and replacements) within a macro
 Syntax highlighting (extendable to many different languages)
 Ability to call external programs (such as compilers)
 Regex matching can be used to jump to a line number in a file given in the output from external programs (e.g. to locate the cause of a compiler error)
 Automatic integration with Java JDK, if JDK is already on the machine
 Large file support
 Support for editing multiple files, with tabbed document selection
 Block select mode
 Synchronized scrolling of multiple files
 Clip libraries – snippet management for reusable portions of text to insert into documents
 Clipboard history – Allowing TextPad to function as a multiple clipboard tool
 Bookmarking of lines, therefore allowing users to copy specific lines (e.g. log file error messages), and then paste them to another document.
 Multi-lingual support: User interface is available in seven languages with spelling dictionaries available in ten languages.

Clip Library 
The Clip Library is a TextPad sidebar that allows users to store small items persistently, and then use them easily. In other editors such as Komodo, a clip library is known as "snippets".

There are clip libraries available.

Reception 
TextPad has received generally favorable reviews. In 2015 Mike Williams of PC Advisor called it "an excellent Notepad replacement with a stack of essential features." Download.com described it in 2014 as an affordable editor suited for coding, "neither the most powerful nor most expensive shareware text tool, though many users will find it more than meets their needs at a fraction of the cost of similar tools."

See also
 Comparison of text editors
 List of text editors

References

External links
 

1992 software
Shareware
Windows text editors
Clipboard (computing)